Blönduós Airport  is an airport serving Blönduós, Iceland.

The Blonduos non-directional beacon (Ident: BL) is 2.5 nautical miles north of the runway 21 threshold.

See also

 Transport in Iceland
 List of airports in Iceland

References

 Google Earth

External links
 OurAirports - Iceland
 OurAirports - Hjaltabakki
 Hjaltabakki Airport

Airports in Iceland